Shendi Airport is an airport serving Shendi in Sudan.

Airports in Sudan